Windows Easy Transfer is a specialized file transfer program developed by Microsoft that allows users of the Windows operating system to transfer personal files and settings from a computer running an earlier version of Windows to a computer running a newer version.

Windows Easy Transfer was introduced in Windows Vista and is included in Windows 7, Windows 8, and Windows 8.1. It replaces the Files and Settings Transfer Wizard included with Windows XP and offers limited migration services for computers running Windows 2000 SP4 and Windows XP SP2.  For all versions of Windows, it does not transfer applications—only files and settings. 

Microsoft incorporated a key technology into the Windows Easy Transfer tool based on its acquisition of Apptimum in 2006. Apptimum's technology complemented the transfer experience offered across multiple Windows operating systems, including Windows 7, Windows 8.1, Windows Vista and Windows 10.

Windows Easy Transfer was discontinued with Windows 10. From September 1, 2015 to August 31, 2016, Microsoft partnered with Laplink to provide a free download of PCmover Express, which allowed 500 MB of data and settings to be transferred from at least Windows XP to either Windows 8.1 or Windows 10.

History
For Windows 2000, Microsoft developed the User State Migration Tool command line utility that allowed users of Windows 95-98 and Windows NT 4.0 to migrate their data and settings to the newer operating system; it did not provide a graphical user interface. An additional migration tool, Files and Settings Transfer Wizard (migwiz.exe) was developed for Windows XP to facilitate the migration of data and settings from Windows 98 and Windows Me. It could be launched from the Windows XP CD-ROM and presented options to transfer data and settings via a 3.5-inch floppy, computer network, direct cable connection, or a zip disk. Users could also create a wizard disk to initiate the migration process when run from earlier operating system.

A preliminary version of Windows Easy Transfer was demonstrated at the 2004 Windows Hardware Engineering Conference by Jim Allchin as the successor to the Files and Settings Transfer Wizard, scheduled for release in the next client version of Windows, Windows Vista (then codenamed "Longhorn"). As with the final release, this preliminary version could use an optional specialized USB cable to transfer data between computers.

After the release to manufacturing of Windows 7, Microsoft backported the version of Windows Easy Transfer in that operating system to Windows XP and Windows Vista as an optional download to facilitate migration to the new operating system.

Items transferred
Windows Easy Transfer can transfer:
 Data files and folders
For transferring from Windows versions later than Windows 2000:
 User accounts and their settings
 Windows and application configuration data stored in files or in the Windows Registry
As of Windows 8.1, Easy Transfer can no longer export data to another computer, but can still open files created on an earlier version of Windows.

Windows Easy Transfer does not support transferring installed applications. Microsoft planned to release a supplementary Windows Easy Transfer Companion for transferring certain supported applications from Windows XP to Windows Vista, but it remained as a perpetual beta during development and a final version was never released.

Transfer methods
Several transfer methods can be used:
 An Easy Transfer Cable (not supported on Windows 8.1)
 A computer network
 A CD recorder or DVD recorder and sufficient number of CDs or DVDs
 A USB flash drive or an external hard disk drive. In this mode Windows Easy Transfer saves archive files of files and settings on the source machine to a user-specified location, which does not need to be a USB drive; the destination machine is then given access to the archives.

Restrictions
Windows Easy Transfer does not support migration from a 64-bit to a 32-bit system. Windows Vista and later versions do not support incoming connections over IrDA, serial, or parallel ports, but incoming connections over Ethernet, HPNA, and wireless LAN are supported.

In Windows 8.1, Windows Easy Transfer can only import settings from Windows 7, Windows 8, and Windows RT, but not from Windows Vista or from another Windows 8.1 computer. The only transfer method supported in Windows 8.1 is by a USB flash drive; transfers by an Easy Transfer Cable or a network connection are not supported.

See also
Management features new to Windows Vista
Easy Transfer Cable

References

Discontinued Windows components
Software features
Windows Vista